Eudes of Brittany may refer to:
Eudes, Count of Penthièvre (c. 999–1079), Duke of Brittany
Eudes II, Viscount of Porhoët (died 1170), Duke of Brittany